Frank M. Bass (December 27, 1926 – December 1, 2006) was an American academic in the field of marketing research and marketing science. He was the creator of the Bass diffusion model that describes the adoption of new products and technologies by first-time buyers.  He died on December 1, 2006.

Career
Bass grew up in the small town of Cuero, Texas. He served in the United States Navy for two years (1944–46).

He received his BBA from Southwestern University in 1949, and his MBA from the University of Texas in 1950. After completing his M.B.A. at Texas, he became interested in marketing issues. He worked as a teaching assistant and assistant professor in marketing while earning his Ph.D. at the University of Illinois in 1954. In 1957 he became an assistant professor in marketing at the University of Texas.

In 1959, Bass was made a Fellow at Harvard University's Institute of Basic Mathematics For Application to Business. This exposure to advanced analytic methods influenced his research for the next 47 years. In 1961 he became a professor of industrial administration at the Graduate School of Purdue University. In 1969 he published the paper on modeling consumer goods, which later became known as the Bass diffusion model. The model describes the process of how new products and services are adopted as the outcome of an interaction between users and potential users. The Bass Model is a well-known empirical generalization in marketing, along with the Dirichlet (Ehrenberg et al. 2004; Goodhardt et al. 2006; Goodhardt et al. 1984, Schmittlein, Bemmaor and Morrison 1985), and is widely cited in published works.

In 1974 he was appointed as Loeb Distinguished Professor of Marketing at the Krannert Graduate School of Management of Purdue University. From 1972-75, Bass served as the Editor-in-Chief of Journal of Marketing Research. In 1982 he returned to Texas when he was appointed Eugene McDermott Professor of Management at the University of Texas, Dallas.

Awards and recognition
In 1986 Bass was awarded the Paul D. Converse Award.  In 1990 he was awarded the American Marketing Association/Richard D. Irwin/McGraw-Hill Distinguished Marketing Educator Award. He was elected to the 2002 class of Fellows of the Institute for Operations Research and the Management Sciences.
In 2005 Bass was awarded an honorary doctorate by the University of South Australia, and the Ehrenberg-Bass Institute for Marketing Science at the University was named partially in his honor.

His research contributions over a 52-year career in academics and private consulting ranged widely over a broad set of marketing issues. Using models and advanced statistical techniques often adapted from economics and the social sciences, he made fundamental contributions that changed the way marketing was taught in universities and applied in business  
Bass is one of the most frequently cited marketing researchers in professional journals and other scholarly publications

See also
Bass diffusion model
Product forecasting

References

External links
 Frank M. Bass Official Website
 Ehrenberg-Bass Institute
 Biographical Information
List of publications
 Diffusion of Innovations, 5th Edition, by Everett M. Rogers, Simon and Schuster, 16 August 2003 - 576 pages, 
Predicting the speed of technology introduction
Interactive Bass Diffusion Model
Biography of Frank Bass from the Institute for Operations Research and the Management Sciences (INFORMS)

1926 births
2006 deaths
Market researchers
Marketing people
Harvard Fellows
McCombs School of Business alumni
Fellows of the American Marketing Association
Fellows of the Institute for Operations Research and the Management Sciences
University of Illinois Urbana-Champaign alumni
University of Texas at Dallas faculty
Purdue University faculty
American marketing people
People from Cuero, Texas
American military personnel of World War II
Journal of Marketing Research editors